Yip Chi Ho (born October 21, 1985 in Hong Kong) is a Hong Kong professional footballer who last played for Yuen Long as a midfielder. He moved to South China from Rangers (HKG) after the end of the 2006-07 season and represented the team in all six 2008 AFC Cup matches in the season. He was released by TSW Pegasus in 2010.

Career statistics

Club career
As of 14 May 2008

Notes and references

External links
Yip Chi Ho at HKFA
Profile at rangers.com.hk 

1985 births
Living people
Hong Kong footballers
Hong Kong First Division League players
Hong Kong Rangers FC players
Kitchee SC players
South China AA players
TSW Pegasus FC players
Fourway Athletics players
Southern District FC players
Association football midfielders
Yuen Long FC players
Footballers at the 2006 Asian Games
Asian Games competitors for Hong Kong